The Common Public Attribution License ("CPAL") is a free software license approved by the Open Source Initiative in 2007.  Its purpose is to be a general license for software distributed over a network.  It is based on the Mozilla Public License, but it adds an attribution term paraphrased below:

The CPAL also adds the following section discussing "network use" which triggers copyleft provisions when running CPAL licensed code on a network service and this way closing the so-called ASP loophole:

The Debian project found the license to be incompatible with its Free Software Guidelines (DFSG) because of its attribution requirement.

References

External links

CPAL version 1.0 text at the Open Source Initiative
Jonathan Corbet on July 31, 2007 on LWN.net: "Open-source badgeware", discussing problematic attribution requirements

Free and open-source software licenses
Copyleft